Karlowitz may refer to:

 Sremski Karlovci, a town in Vojvodina, Serbia (Karlowitz in German)
 Treaty of Karlowitz (1699)